In the mythology of the Wunambal people of northwestern Australia, Ungud is a snake god who is sometimes male, sometimes female and sometimes androgynous. He is associated with rainbows and the fertility and erections of the tribe's shamans. In the beginning, when only the sky and the earth existed, Ungud lived underground as a giant python. Ungud is associated with earth and water and is credited with causing rain to fall. At night, Ungud and Wallanganda, the sky deity (associated with the Milky Way), created living beings through their dreams.

See also
Dhakhan
Galeru

References

Androgynous and hermaphroditic deities
Fertility deities
Rain deities
Rainbow serpent deities